This list comprises all players who have participated in at least one league match for Seattle Sounders from the time the USL began keeping archived records in 2003, until the team's last competitive season in 2008. Players who were on the roster but never played a first team game are not listed; players who appeared for the team in other competitions (US Open Cup, CONCACAF Champions League, etc.) but never actually made an USL appearance are noted at the bottom of the page where appropriate.

A "†" denotes players who only appeared in a single match.
A "*" denotes players who are known to have appeared for the team prior to 2003.

A
  Seyi Abolaji
  Chugger Adair *
  Hugo Alcaraz-Cuellar
  Pedro Amusu *
  Jason Annicchero *
  Robbie Aristodemo
  Geoff Aunger *

B
  Mark Baena *
  Casey Barber *
  Kieran Barton *
  Patrick Beech *
  Fawzi Belal
  Alex Bengard
  Jacob Besagno
  Nikolas Besagno
  Rees Bettinger *
  Tom Bialek *
  Jonathan Bolaños
  Jason Boyce *
  Nate Boyden
  Chad Brown
  Preston Burpo

C
  Sean Michael Callahan
  J.P. Capodanno *
  Mike Casale *
  Jason Cascio
  Franklin Chacón
  Brian Ching *
  Billy Colelo *
  John Cowmay *
  Billy Crook *
  Derek Crothers *
  Rich Cullen *

D
  Nate Daligcon *
  Fabian Davis *
  Ben Dragavon
  Oscar Draguicevich *
  James Dunn *
  Jason Dunn *
  Tom Dutra *
  Andrew Dallman *

E
  Dion Earl *
  Ryan Edwards
  Mike Enneking *
  Chris Eylander

F
  Chris Farnsworth *
  Jason Farrell *
  Eddie Fernandez *
  Vincente Figueroa *
  John Fishbaugher
  Greg Foisie
  Kevin Forrest
  Chance Fry *
  Robby Fulton

G
  Mike Gailey *
  Maykel Galindo
  Josh Gardner
  Shawn Gaw *
  Paul Gelvezon *
  Herculez Gomez *
  Taylor Graham
  Andrew Gregor
  Henry Gutierrez

H
  Marcus Hahnemann *
  Peter Hattrup *
  Jordan Harvey
  Brian Haynes *
  Ollie Heald *
  Gary Heale *
  Pat Henderson *
  Sean Henderson
  David Hernandez *
  David Hoggan *
  Greg Howes
  Dusty Hudock *
  Danny Huet *
  Matt Hulen

J
  Bernie James *
  Danny Jackson
  Scott Jenkins

K
  Youssouf Kanté
  Stephen Keel
  Dominic Kinnear *
  Kei Kinoshita
  C. J. Klaas
  Nathan Knox

L
  Kevin Lamey *
  Gerardo Laterza *
  Joey Leonetti *
  Sébastien Le Toux
  Roger Levesque

M
  David Mahoney
  Randy Mann *
  Bill May *
  Bobby McAllister *
  Dick McCormick *
  Bryan McNiel *
  Shawn Medved *
  Neil Megson *
  Noah Merl
  Doug Morrill *
  Shannon Murray *

N
  Alexander Nouri *
  Sanna Nyassi
  Viet Nguyen *

O
  Ciaran O'Brien
  Leighton O'Brien

P
  Charles Paulson*
  Shawn Percell
  Michael Perrin *
  Dylin Pillay *
  Eugene Poublon *
  Brandon Prideaux *
  Sean Purcell

R
  Santa Maria Rivera
  Marco Rizi *
  Ralph Robertson *
  Esmundo Rodriguez *
  Michael Rodríguez
  Ian Russell *

S
  Jake Sagare
  Kevin Sakuda
  Darren Sawatzky
  Brian Schmetzer *
  Andre Schmid
  Zach Scott
  George Singh *
  Billy Sleeth
  Kyle Smith
  Ben Somoza
  Tim Steidten *
  Jason Stoddard *
  Erik Storkson *
  Gabe Sturm
  Jamal Sutton

T
  Stoner Tadlock *
  Andrade Taffalo *
  Niall Thompson *
  Craig Tomlinson
  Kenji Treschuk

U
  Ali John Utush *
  Rashid Utush *

V
  Marco Vélez

W
  Craig Waibel *
  James Ward
  Mark Watson *
  Cam Weaver
  Wade Webber *
  Welton
  Adam West
  Brent Whitfield
  Brett Wiesner
  Mark Wittstruck

Sources

Lists of soccer players by club in the United States
 
players
Association football player non-biographical articles